Angelo Javier Ibarra (born 20 April 1999) is an Argentine professional footballer who plays as a forward.

Career
Ibarra made the move into senior football with Los Andes in 2018–19. He was substituted on in Primera B Nacional fixtures with Guillermo Brown and Olimpo by manager Aníbal Biggeri in October 2018, who then selected the forward to start an eventual 0–2 defeat to Atlético de Rafaela in November. Ibarra left in 2019.

Career statistics
.

References

External links

1999 births
Living people
People from Corrientes
Argentine footballers
Association football forwards
Primera Nacional players
Club Atlético Los Andes footballers
Sportspeople from Corrientes Province